National Tertiary Route 417, or just Route 417 (or ) is a National Road Route of Costa Rica, located in the Cartago province.

Description
It is the main access to Turrialba Volcano National Park, coming from Route 219 which in turn is the main access to Irazú Volcano National Park.

In Cartago province the route covers Turrialba canton (Santa Cruz district), Alvarado canton (Pacayas, Capellades districts).

History
As of December 2020 there is a conflict of interests between the owners of a farm, whom want to declare the route private, and the government. So an alternative route to the national park is signaled along the way.

References

Highways in Costa Rica